Oddbjørg Ausdal Starrfelt (born 22 July 1948 in Klepp) is a Norwegian politician for the Labour Party.

She was elected to the Norwegian Parliament from Rogaland in 1993, and was re-elected on two occasions.

Starrfelt was a member of Klepp municipality council from 1983 to 1984, and of Rogaland county council from 1991 to 1993.

References

1948 births
Living people
People from Klepp
Labour Party (Norway) politicians
Members of the Storting
Women members of the Storting
21st-century Norwegian politicians
21st-century Norwegian women politicians
20th-century Norwegian politicians
20th-century Norwegian women politicians